This is a list of high schools in the state of New Hampshire.

See also 
 List of school districts in New Hampshire
 List of colleges and universities in New Hampshire

External links 
High School Towns – NH Dept. of Education list of public high schools and the towns they serve

New Hampshire
Schools